"Hurts So Good" is a song by American singer-songwriter John Mellencamp, then performing under the stage name "John Cougar". The song was a number two hit on the Billboard Hot 100 for the singer/songwriter. It was the first of three major hit singles from his 1982 album American Fool. The others were "Jack & Diane" and "Hand to Hold On To," which were all released in 1982. The song was also a critical success with Mellencamp, winning the Best Rock Vocal Performance, Male at the 25th Grammy Awards on February 23, 1983.

Background and recording
"Hurts So Good" was written by Mellencamp and George Green, Mellencamp's childhood friend and occasional writing partner. The song was first conceived, Mellencamp claims, when he had uttered the phrase "hurt so good.” Mellencamp repeated the lines to Green, and they finished the song very quickly. In 2004, Mellencamp expounded on the writing of "Hurts So Good" in an interview with American Songwriter magazine: "George Green and I wrote that together. We exchanged lines back and forth between each other and laughed about it at the time. Then I went and picked up the guitar, and within seconds, I had those chords."

The song was recorded at Cherokee Studios in Los Angeles, California and was engineered by Don Gehman and George Tutko. Backing Mellencamp were Larry Crane and Mike Wanchic (guitars, backing vocals), Kenny Aronoff (drums), George "Chocolate" Perry (bass) and Dave Parman (backing vocals).

Reception
Cash Box said that "steady 4/4 snare work and choppy fuzz tone guitar chords kick off this steel-edged pop/rocker."

Music video

Charts
The song hit number one on Billboard's Hot Tracks mainstream rock chart. It peaked at number two on the Billboard Hot 100 on August 7, 1982 and, although it failed to make number one, it spent 16 weeks in the top 10, the longest time for any song in the 1980s. It was kept off the top spot by "Eye of the Tiger" by Survivor. The song was listed at #83 on Billboard's Greatest Songs of All Time.

The single was also a hit in Canada reaching #3 on RPM magazine's Top 50 Singles chart. It reached number five in Australia and South Africa

Weekly charts

Year-end charts

All-time charts

See also 
List of number-one mainstream rock hits (United States)

References

1982 singles
John Mellencamp songs
Cashbox number-one singles
Music videos directed by Bruce Gowers
Songs written by John Mellencamp
Song recordings produced by Don Gehman
Grammy Award for Best Male Rock Vocal Performance
Songs written by George Green (songwriter)
Songs about BDSM
1982 songs
Riva Records singles